Ashenground and Bolnore Woods is a   Local Nature Reserve in Haywards Heath in West Sussex. It is owned and managed by Mid Sussex District Council.

These woods have oak, beech and field maple, together with old coppice hornbeam, ash and hazel. Fauna include bats, woodpeckers and owls.

Both woods are open to the public.

References

Local Nature Reserves in West Sussex
Forests and woodlands of West Sussex